"Going, Going, Gone" is a song written by Jan Crutchfield, and performed by American country music artist Lee Greenwood.  It was released in December 1983 as the third single from the album Somebody's Gonna Love You.  The song was Greenwood's second number one on the country chart.  The single went to number one for one week and spent twelve weeks on the country chart.

Charts

Weekly charts

Year-end charts

References

1984 singles
Lee Greenwood songs
MCA Records singles
Song recordings produced by Jerry Crutchfield
Songs written by Jan Crutchfield
1983 songs